M. Anbazhagan is a film director and screenwriter. His debut film is Saattai, and he works in Tamil cinema. Saattai stars Samuthirakani.

Filmography

References 

Tamil film directors
Tamil screenwriters
Living people
21st-century Indian film directors
1987 births